Champion REIT is a Hong Kong real estate investment trust that owns office and commercial properties, primarily in Asia.

Overview
Champion REIT was spun off from its sponsor Great Eagle Holdings, and listed on 24 May 2006 on the Hong Kong Stock Exchange. Its principal asset at the time was its stake in Citibank Plaza. Eagle Asset Management (CP) Limited, a subsidiary of the Great Eagle Holdings, is the REIT manager; HSBC Institutional Trust Services (Asia) Limited is the trustee.

Citibank Plaza
Champion REIT owns 95.7% stake in Citibank Plaza, a modern glass and steel office complex that comprises Citibank Tower, a 47-storey building, and ICBC Tower, a 37-storey building, and includes a retail podium as well as a parking garage for 555 vehicles. Most of the stake was purchased by the REIT for HK$18.7 billion at the time of its initial public offering. An additional three floors within the complex were purchased by Champion REIT subsequently from Kerry Properties.

Langham Place
On 3 June 2008, Champion REIT acquired from Great Eagle Holdings the non-hotel components of Langham Place in Mong Kok, Hong Kong, for HK$12.5 billion. The acquisition included 702,900 square feet (65,300 m²) of office space within the 59-storey Langham Place Office Tower and the entire Langham Place Mall which has 589,800 square feet (54,792 m²) of retail space and 250 parking spaces in the basement of the project. The Langham Place project was completed in July 2004. . The consideration valued the retail portion at HK$12,519 per square foot and about HK$6,815 for the office portion, an 11.8% discount to the appraised value.

References

External links
 

2006 establishments in Hong Kong
Companies listed on the Hong Kong Stock Exchange
Real estate investment trusts of Hong Kong